In Japan,  refers to a person's , and  refers contrastingly to . This distinction began to be made in the post-war era.

A person's  may be contrary to what is expected by society or what is required according to one's position and circumstances, and they are often kept hidden, except with one's closest friends.  is what is expected by society and required according to one's position and circumstances, and these may or may not match one's . In many cases,  leads to outright telling of lies in order to avoid exposing the true inward feelings.

Professor Takeo Doi considered  the  divide  to be of paramount importance in Japanese culture.

Causes
In Japanese culture, public failure and the disapproval of others are seen as particular sources of shame and reduced social standing, so it is common to avoid direct confrontation or disagreement in most social contexts. Traditionally, social norms dictate that one should attempt to minimize discord; failure to do so might be seen as insulting or aggressive. For this reason, the Japanese tend to go to great lengths to avoid conflict, especially within the context of large groups. By upholding this social norm, one is socially protected from such transgressions by others.

For example, the protagonist would have to choose between carrying out his obligations to his family/feudal lord or pursuing a clandestine love affair.

The same concept in Chinese culture is called "inside face" and "outside face", and these two aspects also frequently come into conflict.

Effects

In any case, all cultures have conventions that help to determine appropriate communication and behavior in various social contexts which are implicitly understood without an explicit name for the social mores on which the conventions are based.

Nowadays, the phrase is used for two different meanings, expressing the samurai virtue of self-discipline, silent moral heroism, or ridiculing stubbornness, face-savingness.

See also
 Japanese values
 Smile mask syndrome, Japan
 Tadanobu Tsunoda
 The Anatomy of Dependence, Japanese book
 
 Ambivalence
 Egosyntonic and egodystonic
 Emotional conflict
Preference falsification
 Self-discrepancy theory
 Splitting (psychology)
 True self and false self
 Persona (psychology)

References

Society of Japan
Japanese values
Japanese culture
Japanese words and phrases
Dichotomies